A by-election was held in the state electoral district of Blacktown on 14 October 2017. The by-election was triggered by the resignation of John Robertson. Robertson served as state Leader of the Opposition from 2011 until 2014.

The by-election was held on the same day as by-elections Cootamundra and Murray.

Candidates
The candidates in ballot paper order are as follows:

Results

John Robertson resigned.

See also
Electoral results for the district of Blacktown
List of New South Wales state by-elections

References

External links
New South Wales Electoral Commission: Blacktown State By-election
ABC Elections: Blacktown by-election

2017 elections in Australia
New South Wales state by-elections